Incubation is the religious practice of sleeping in a sacred area with the intention of experiencing a divinely inspired dream or cure. Incubation was practised by many ancient cultures.   In perhaps the most well known instance among the Hebrews, found in 1 Kings 3, Solomon went to Gibeon "because that was the most renowned high place to offer sacrifices." There "the  appeared to Solomon in a dream at night," and Solomon asked God for the gift of an understanding heart.  Among the members of the cult of Asclepius, votive offerings found at ritual centres at Epidaurus, Pergamum, and Rome detail the perceived effectiveness of the method. Incubation was adopted by certain Christian sects and is still used in a few Greek monasteries. Modern practices for influencing dream content by dream incubation use more research-driven techniques, but sometimes they incorporate elements reflecting ancient beliefs.

A form of incubation was also used by the iatromantes of the ancient Greeks. According to Peter Kingsley, iatromantis figures belonged to a wider Greek and Asian shamanic tradition with origins in Central Asia. A main ecstatic, meditative practice of these healer-prophets was incubation (ἐγκοίμησις, enkoimesis). More than just a medical technique, incubation reportedly allowed a human being to experience a fourth state of consciousness different from sleeping, dreaming, or ordinary waking: a state that Kingsley describes as “consciousness itself” and likens to the turiya or samādhi of the Indian yogic traditions.

References

Further reading

 Edward Tick, PhD, The Practice of Dream Healing, Wheaton, IL: Quest Books, 2001
 Peter Kingsley, In the Dark Places of Wisdom, Inverness, CA: Golden Sufi Center, 1999
 
 
 
 
 
 
 

Dreams in religion
Religious rituals